Education in Italy is compulsory from 6 to 16 years of age, and is divided into five stages: kindergarten (scuola dell'infanzia), primary school (scuola primaria or scuola elementare), lower secondary school (scuola secondaria di primo grado or scuola media inferiore), upper secondary school (scuola secondaria di secondo grado or scuola media superiore) and university (università). Education is free in Italy and free education is available to children of all nationalities who are residents in Italy. Italy has both a private and public education system. 

In 2018, the Italian secondary education was evaluated as below the OECD average. Italy scored below the OECD average in reading and science, and near OECD average in mathematics. Mean performance in Italy declined in reading and science, and remained stable in mathematics. Trento and Bolzano scored at an above the national average in reading. Compared to school children in other OECD countries, children in Italy missed out on a greater amount of learning due to absences and indiscipline in classrooms. A wide gap exists between northern schools, which perform near average, and schools in the South, that had much poorer results. 

Tertiary education in Italy is divided between public universities, private universities and the prestigious and selective superior graduate schools, such as the Scuola Normale Superiore di Pisa. 33 Italian universities were ranked among the world's top 500 in 2019, the third-largest number in Europe after the United Kingdom and Germany. Bologna University, founded in 1088, is the oldest university in continuous operation, as well as one of the leading academic institutions in Italy and Europe. The Bocconi University, Università Cattolica del Sacro Cuore, LUISS, Polytechnic University of Turin, Polytechnic University of Milan, Sapienza University of Rome, and University of Milan are also ranked among the best in the world.

History

In Italy a state school system or Education System has existed since 1859, when the Legge Casati (Casati Act) mandated educational responsibilities for the forthcoming Italian state (Italian unification took place in 1861).
The Casati Act made primary education compulsory, and had the goal of increasing literacy. This law gave control of primary education to the single towns, of secondary education to the provinces, and the universities were managed by the State.
Even with the Casati Act and compulsory education, in rural (and southern) areas children often were not sent to school (the rate of children enrolled in primary education would reach 90% only after 70 years) and the illiteracy rate (which was nearly 80% in 1861) took more than 50 years to halve.

The next important law concerning the Italian education system was the Legge Gentile. This act was issued in 1923, thus when Benito Mussolini and his National Fascist Party were in power. In fact, Giovanni Gentile was appointed the task of creating an education system deemed fit for the fascist system. The compulsory age of education was raised to 14 years, and was somewhat based on a ladder system: after the first five years of primary education, one could choose the 'Scuola media', which would give further access to the "liceo" and other secondary education, or the 'avviamento al lavoro' (work training), which was intended to give a quick entry into the low strates of the workforce.
The reform enhanced the role of the Liceo Classico, created by the Casati Act in 1859 (and intended during the Fascist era as the peak of secondary education, with the goal of forming the future upper classes), and created the Technical, Commercial and Industrial institutes and the Liceo Scientifico.
The Liceo Classico was the only secondary school that gave access to all types of higher education until 1968.
The influence of Gentile's Idealism was great, and he considered the Catholic religion to be the "foundation and crowning" of education.
In 1962 the 'avviamento al lavoro' was abolished, and all children up to 14 years had to follow a single program, encompassing primary education (scuola elementare) and middle school (scuola media).

From 1962 to the present day, the main structure of Italian primary (and secondary) education remained largely unchanged, even if some modifications were made: a narrowing of the gap between males and females (through the merging of the two distinct programmes for technical education, and the optional introduction of mixed-gender gym classes), a change in the structure of secondary school (legge Berlinguer) and the creation of new licei, 'istituti tecnici' and 'istituti professionali', offering students a broader range of options.

In 1999, in accordance with the guidelines laid down by the Bologna Process, the Italian university system switched from the old system (vecchio ordinamento, which led to the traditional 5-year Laurea degree), to the new system (nuovo ordinamento).  The nuovo ordinamento split the former Laurea into two tracks: the Laurea triennale (a three-year degree akin to the Bachelor's Degree), followed by the 2-year Laurea specialistica (Master's Degree), the latter renamed Laurea Magistrale in 2007.  A credit system was established to quantify the amount of work needed by each course and exam (25 work hours = 1 credit), as well as enhance the possibility to change course of studies and facilitate the transfer of credits for further studies or go on exchange (e.g. Erasmus Programme) in another country. However, it is now established that there is just a five-year degree "Laurea Magistrale a Ciclo Unico" for programmes such as Law and a six-year degree for Medicine.

In 2019, Education minister Lorenzo Fioramonti announced that in 2020 Italy would become the first country in the world to make the study of climate change and sustainable development mandatory for students.

Primary education

Primary school (scuola primaria, also known as scuola elementare), is commonly preceded by three years of non-compulsory nursery school (or kindergarten, asilo). Primary school lasts five years. Until middle school, the educational curriculum is the same for all pupils: although one can attend a private or state-funded school, the subjects studied are the same (with the exception of special schools for the blind or the hearing-impaired): the students are given a basic education in Italian, English, mathematics, natural sciences, history, geography, social studies, and physical education. Some schools also have Spanish or French, musical arts and visual arts.

Until 2004, pupils had to pass an exam to access middle school (scuola secondaria di primo grado), comprising the composition of a short essay in Italian, a written math test, and an oral test on the other subjects. The exam has been discontinued and pupils can now enter middle school directly.

Usually students start primary school at the age of 6, but students who are born between January and March and are still 5 years old can access primary school early; this is called primina and the students doing it are called anticipatari. For example, a student born in February 2002 can attend primary school with students born in 2001.

Secondary education

Secondary education in Italy lasts 8 years and is divided into two stages: middle school (scuola secondaria di primo grado, also known as scuola media) and high school (scuola secondaria di secondo grado, also known as scuola superiore). Middle school lasts three years (roughly from age 11 to 14), and high school lasts five years (roughly from age 14 to 19). Every tier involves an exam at the end of the final year, required to earn a degree and have access to further education.
Both in middle school and high school, students stay in the classroom for most of the time (barring such classes as physical education, which most often takes place in the gym), so it's the teachers who have to move from one classroom to another during the day.

In the lower middle school pupils start school at 8:00 am and finish at 1:00 pm (they may start later; they have a five-hour daily schedule, excluding variations), while in high school they attend school 5 to 8 hours a day depending on the day of the week and on the rules of the school. 
Usually, there are no breaks between each class, but most schools have a recess that lasts 15 to 30 minutes halfway through. If students have to stay in school even after lunch, there's a longer break to let them eat and rest.

There are three types of high school, subsequently divided into further specialization. There are subjects taught in each of these, such as Italian, English, mathematics, history, but most subjects are peculiar to a particular type of course (i.e. ancient Greek in the Liceo Classico, business economics in the Istituto tecnico economico or scenography in the Liceo Artistico):
Liceo (lyceum)
The education received in a Liceo is mostly theoretical, with a specialization in a specific field of studies which can be:
 humanities and antiquity (liceo classico),
 mathematics and science (liceo scientifico), 
 foreign languages (liceo linguistico), 
 psychology and pedagogy (liceo delle scienze umane), 
 economy (liceo economico-sociale), 
 fine arts (liceo artistico). 
Also, some schools have special options with more hours for some subjects, some lessons taken in English, or some different courses (called indirizzi) like liceo scientifico has "indirizzo liceo scientifico" (or "indirizzo tradizionale"), with latin, or "indirizzo liceo scientifico-scienze applicate" where there's not latin, there is informatics.
Istituto tecnico (technical institute)
The education given in an Istituto tecnico offers both a wide theoretical education and a specialization in a specific field of studies (e.g.: economy, administration, technology, tourism, agronomy), often integrated with a three/six months internship in a company, association or university, from the third to the fifth and last year of study.
Istituto professionale (professional institute)
This type of school offers a form of secondary education oriented towards practical subjects (engineering, agriculture, gastronomy, technical assistance, handcrafts), and enables the students to start searching for a job as soon as they have completed their studies, sometimes sooner, as some schools offer a diploma after three years instead of five.

Any type of high school which lasts 5 years grants access to the final exam, called esame di maturità or esame di stato, that takes place every year between June and July and grants access to university. This exam consists of an oral examination and written tests. Some of them, like the Italian one, are the same for each school, while others are different according to the type of school. For example, in the Liceo classico students have to translate a Latin or ancient Greek text; in the Liceo scientifico students have to solve mathematics or physics problems; and so on. An Italian student is usually 19 when they enter university.

Higher education

Italy has a large and international network of public or state-affiliated universities and schools offering degrees in higher education. State-run universities of Italy constitute the main percentage of tertiary education in Italy and are managed under the supervision of Italian's Ministry of Education.

Italian universities are among the oldest universities in the world; the University of Bologna (founded in 1088) notably, is the oldest one ever; also, University of Padua, founded in 1222, and University of Naples Federico II are the oldest universities in Europe. Most universities in Italy are state-supported. 33 Italian universities were ranked among the world's top 500 in 2019, the third-largest number in Europe after the United Kingdom and Germany.

There are also a number of Superior Graduate Schools (Grandes écoles) or Scuola Superiore Universitaria, offer officially recognized titles, including the Diploma di Perfezionamento equivalent to a Doctorate, Dottorato di Ricerca i.e. Research Doctorate or Doctor Philosophiae i.e. PhD. Some of them also organize courses Master's degree. There are three Superior Graduate Schools with "university status", three institutes with the status of Doctoral Colleges, which function at graduate and post-graduate level. Nine further schools are direct offshoots of the universities (i.e. do not have their own 'university status'). The first one is the Scuola Normale Superiore di Pisa (founded in 1810 by Napoleon as a branch of École Normale Supérieure), taking the model of organization from the famous École Normale Supérieure. These institutions are commonly referred to as "Schools of Excellence" (i.e. "Scuole di Eccellenza").

Italy hosts a broad variety of universities, colleges and academies. Founded in 1088, the University of Bologna is likely the oldest in the world. In 2009, the University of Bologna is, according to The Times, the only Italian college in the top 200 World Universities. Milan's Bocconi University has been ranked among the top 20 best business schools in the world by The Wall Street Journal international rankings, especially thanks to its M.B.A. program, which in 2007 placed it no. 17 in the world in terms of graduate recruitment preference by major multinational companies. Bocconi was also ranked by Forbes as the best worldwide in the specific category Value for Money. In May 2008, Bocconi overtook several traditionally top global business schools in the Financial Times Executive education ranking, reaching no. 5 in Europe and no. 15 in the world.

Other top universities and polytechnics are the Università Cattolica del Sacro Cuore in Milan, the LUISS in Rome, the Polytechnic University of Turin, the Politecnico di Milano (which in 2011 was ranked as the 48th best technical university in the world by QS World University Rankings), the University of Rome La Sapienza (which in 2005 was Europe's 33rd best university, and ranks among Europe's 50 and the world's 150 best colleges and in 2013, the Center for World University Rankings ranked the Sapienza University of Rome 62nd in the world and the top in Italy in its World University Rankings.) and the University of Milan (whose research and teaching activities have developed over the years and have received important international recognition). This University is the only Italian member of the League of European Research Universities (LERU), a prestigious group of twenty research-intensive European Universities. It has also been awarded ranking positions such as 1st in Italy and 7th in Europe (The Leiden Ranking – Universiteit Leiden).

Summary
Compulsory education is highlighted in yellow.

Standards 
In 2018, the Italian secondary education was evaluated as below the OECD average. Italy scored below the OECD average in reading and science, and near OECD average in mathematics. Mean performance in Italy declined in reading and science, and remained stable in mathematics. Trento and Bolzano scored at an above the national average in reading. Compared to school children in other OECD countries, children in Italy missed out on a greater amount of learning due to absences and indiscipline in classrooms. A wide gap exists between northern schools, which perform near average, and schools in the South, that had much poorer results.

See also

Secondary education in Italy
Higher education in Italy
List of schools in Italy
 Open access in Italy

References

Further reading
 Anastasiou, Dimitris, James M. Kauffman, and Santo Di Nuovo. "Inclusive education in Italy: description and reflections on full inclusion." European Journal of Special Needs Education 30.4 (2015): 429-443, regarding students with disabilities 
 Begeny, John C., and Brian K. Martens. "Inclusionary education in Italy: A literature review and call for more empirical research." Remedial and Special education 28.2 (2007): 80-94, regarding students with disabilities.
 Biemmi, Irene. "Gender in schools and culture: taking stock of education in Italy." Gender and Education 27.7 (2015): 812-827. 
 Checchi, Daniele. "University education in Italy." International Journal of Manpower (2000) online.
 D’Alessio, Simona. Inclusive education in Italy (Springer Science & Business Media, 2012).
 Eid, Luca, Nicola Lovecchio, and Marco Bussetti. "Physical and sport education in Italy." Journal of Physical Education & Health-Social Perspective 1.2 (2012): 37-41. online
 Fabbris, Luigi. Effectiveness of University Education in Italy (Physica-Verlag Heidelberg, 2007).
 Luzzatto, Giunio. "Higher Education in Italy 1985-95: an overview." 'European Journal of Education 31.3 (1996): 371-378. online
 Mortari, Luigina, and Roberta Silva. "Teacher Education in Italy." in Teacher Education in the Global Era (Springer, Singapore, 2020) pp. 115-132.
 Musatti, Tullia, and Mariacristina Picchio. "Early education in Italy: Research and practice." International Journal of Early Childhood 42.2 (2010): 141-153. online
 Montgomery, Walter A. Education in Italy (1919) online
 Passow, A. Harry et al. The National Case Study: An Empirical Comparative Study of Twenty-One Educational Systems.  (1976) online
 Todeschini, Marco Enrico. "Teacher Education in Italy: New Trends." Studies on Higher Education (2003): 223+. online
 Türk, Umut. "Socio-economic determinants of student mobility and inequality of access to higher education in Italy." Networks and Spatial Economics 19.1 (2019): 125-148 online.
Historical
 Benadusi, Luciano. "The Attempts at Reform of Secondary Education in Italy." European Journal of Education (1988): 229-236 online.
 Black, Robert. Humanism and education in medieval and Renaissance Italy: tradition and innovation in Latin schools from the twelfth to the fifteenth century (Cambridge University Press, 2001).
 Bozzano, Monica, Gabriele Cappelli, and Michelangelo Vasta. "Whither education? The long shadow of pre-unification school systems into Italy's Liberal Age (1861-1911)." (2022). online

 Cappelli, Gabriele. "One size that didn’t fit all? Electoral franchise, fiscal capacity and the rise of mass schooling across Italy’s provinces, 1870–1911." Cliometrica 10.3 (2016): 311-343. online
 Cappelli, Gabriele, and Michelangelo Vasta. "A 'Silent Revolution': school reforms and Italy’s educational gender gap in the Liberal Age (1861–1921)." Cliometrica 15.1 (2021): 203-229. online
 Cappelli, Gabriele, and Gloria Quiroga Valle. "Female teachers and the rise of primary education in Italy and Spain, 1861–1921: evidence from a new dataset." Economic History Review 74.3 (2021): 754-783. online
 Ciccarelli, Carlo, and Jacob Weisdorf. "Pioneering into the past: Regional literacy developments in Italy before Italy." European Review of Economic History 23.3 (2019): 329-364. online
 Deplano, Valeria. "Making Italians: colonial history and the graduate education system from the liberal era to Fascism." Journal of Modern Italian Studies 18.5 (2013): 580-598.

 Hohnerlein, Eva Maria. "Development and diffusion of early childhood education in Italy: Reflections on the role of the church from a historical perspective (1830–2010)." in The Development of Early Childhood Education in Europe and North America (Palgrave Macmillan, London, 2015) pp. 71–91.
 Lazzini, Arianna, Giuseppina Iacoviello, and Rosella Ferraris Franceschi. "Evolution of accounting education in Italy, 1890–1935." Accounting History 23.1-2 (2018): 44-70 online.
 Minio-Paluello, L. Education In Fascist Italy (1946) online
 Sani, Roberto. "Honest Citizens and Good Christians: Don Bosco and Salesian Education in the 150-year History of United Italy." in Honest Citizens and Good Christians: Don Bosco and Salesian Education in the 150-year History of United Italy'' (2011): 477-489. online

External links
 Information on education in Italy, OECD – Contains indicators and information about Italy and how it compares to other OECD and non-OECD countries
 Diagram of Italian education system, OECD – Using 1997 ISCED classification of programmes and typical ages. Also in Italian